Thomas James Ireland (10 January 1792 – 2 July 1863) was a British Conservative politician.

Born in London, Ireland was the only son of Thomas Ireland. He was admitted to Emmanuel College, Cambridge in Michaelmas of 1810, became a scholar there in 1811, and then graduated as a Bachelor of Arts in 1814, and a Master of Arts in 1817. In 1832, he was admitted to Gray's Inn.

Ireland married Elizbeth Welby, daughter of Sir William Earle Welby, 2nd Baronet and Wilhelmina née Spry in 1829, and they had at least six children: Thomas Ireland (b. 1830); Elizabeth Mary Ireland (b. 1831); Agnes Ireland (b. 1833); Beatrice Ireland (b. 1839); Emily Ireland (b. 1840); and Caroline Charlotte Ireland (1844–1913).

Ireland was elected Conservative Member of Parliament (MP) for Bewdley at the 1847 general election, but he was unseated in March the next year for "bribery and corrupt treating".

He was also a Justice of the Peace and Deputy Lieutenant for Suffolk before his death in London in 1863.

References

External links
 

UK MPs 1847–1852
Conservative Party (UK) MPs for English constituencies
1792 births
1863 deaths
Members of Gray's Inn
Alumni of Emmanuel College, Cambridge
Politicians from London
English justices of the peace
Deputy Lieutenants of Suffolk